Ferrensby is a village and civil parish in the Harrogate district of North Yorkshire, England. The population of the civil parish at the 2011 census was 187. Nearby attractions include a balloon centre and a maze.

The origin of the place-name is from Old Norse and probably means "farmstead or village of the man from the Faroe Islands", and appears as Feresbi in the Domesday Book of 1086.

The village has a public house called The General Tarleton which was named after Banastre Tarleton, a British general who fought on the loyalist side during the American War of Independence.

References

External links

Villages in North Yorkshire
Civil parishes in North Yorkshire